Lyman Norman "Larry" Walbridge (September 11, 1897 – January 11, 1982) was an American football center who played one season with the New York Giants of the National Football League. He first enrolled at Lafayette College before transferring to the Fordham University. He attended Indiana High School in Indiana, Pennsylvania

References

External links
Just Sports Stats

1897 births
1982 deaths
Players of American football from Pennsylvania
American football centers
Lafayette Leopards football players
Fordham Rams football players
New York Giants players
People from Tioga County, Pennsylvania